Jessica Ridgeway (January 23, 2002 – October 5, 2012) was an American girl who, at the age of 10, was kidnapped in Westminster, Colorado, and murdered by Austin Sigg (born January 17, 1995) on October 5, 2012.

Her dismembered body was found five days later. Sigg was sentenced to life imprisonment for the murder in November 2013.

Disappearance
Ridgeway was reported missing on the evening of October 5, 2012 after she failed to return home from school, and an AMBER Alert was issued. Two days later, her school backpack, containing her glasses, was found on a sidewalk. On October 10, her dismembered remains were found in a park in Arvada.

Confession to crime
Later in October 2012, a 17-year-old youth named Austin Sigg confessed to killing Ridgeway. He told police that he kidnapped her as she walked towards where he had parked his Jeep, and then he bound her wrists and ankles with zip ties and took her to his house. There, he forced her to change out of her clothes and into a pair of shorts and a t-shirt before he strangled her, dismembered her body, and hid her limbs and head in a crawl space, before dumping her torso in the park in Arvada.

Trial
Under a 2005 Supreme Court decision, Sigg was not eligible for capital punishment because he was not 18 at the time of the crime. In the court case, he was tried as an adult. Sigg was sentenced to life imprisonment on November 19, 2013, and in June 2014, was moved to an undisclosed out-of-state prison to preserve both his and Ridgeway's family's privacy and safety.

See also
List of kidnappings
List of solved missing person cases

References

2010s missing person cases
2012 in Colorado
2012 murders in the United States
Deaths by person in Colorado
Formerly missing people
Incidents of violence against girls
Kidnappings in the United States
Missing person cases in Colorado
Murder committed by minors
October 2012 crimes in the United States
Violence against women in the United States